The Center for Applied Rationality (CFAR) is a nonprofit organization based in Berkeley, California, that hosts workshops on rationality and cognitive bias. It was founded in 2012 by Julia Galef, Anna Salamon, Michael Smith and Andrew Critch, to improve participants' rationality using "a set of techniques from math and decision theory for forming your beliefs about the world as accurately as possible". Its president since 2021 is Anna Salamon.

CFAR's training draws upon fields such as psychology and behavioral economics in an effort to improve people's mental habits. Jennifer Kahn visited the group and described its strengths and flaws in the New York Times. CFAR has conducted a survey of participants which indicates that workshops reduce neuroticism and increase perceived efficacy.

CFAR is part of the rationality movement surrounding Eliezer Yudkowsky's web site LessWrong, from which CFAR originated. Paul Slovic and Keith Stanovich have served as advisors.

The group taught classes for Facebook and the Thiel Fellowship.

A scholarship funded by the founder of Skype, Jaan Tallinn, has been used to send selected Estonian students to workshops held by the Center for Applied Rationality.

Sonoma County incident 
On 15 November 2019, four people dressed in Guy Fawkes masks were arrested for allegedly barricading off a wooded retreat where CFAR was holding an event. According to police, the suspects were unco-operative and spoke incoherently. Flyers found by deputies suggested they were protesting artificial intelligence and CFAR.

References

External links 
 

Charities based in California
Existential risk organizations
Organizations established in 2012
Existential risk from artificial general intelligence
2012 establishments in California